2015 National Football Challenge Cup was the 25th edition of the Pakistan National Football Challenge Cup, the main domestic cup in Pakistani football. The tournament was held in Lahore, commencing from 15 April 2015 and concluding on 28 April 2015. The season was called NBP National Challenge Cup as it was sponsored by National Bank of Pakistan.

Teams
The 16 participating teams are as below:

 Pakistan AirforceTH,
 K-ElectricPPL
 Khan Research Laboratories
 Pakistan Army
 WAPDA
 Karachi Port Trust
 Pakistan Airlines
 Pakistan Navy
 National Bank
 Habib Bank 
 Pakistan Railways
 Sui Northern Gas
 Sui Southern Gas
 Ashraf Sugar Mills
 Saif Textiles Mills
 Higher Education Commission

Notes TH = Challenge Cup title holders; PPL = Pakistan Premier League winners; H = Host

Group stages

Group A

Group B

Group C

Group D

Knockout round

Quarter finals

Semi-finals

Third place

Final

Top scorers

References

Pakistan National Football Challenge Cup
Football competitions in Pakistan
Pakistan
2015 in Pakistani sport
2015 in Pakistan
2010s in Lahore
2010s in Pakistan
2010s in Pakistani sport
Sport in Lahore